Kavya Shetty is an Indian actress and model who primarily appears in Kannada films. She made her acting debut in 2013 with the Kannada film Nam Duniya Nam Style directed by Preetham Gubbi.

Early life
Shetty was born Mangalore, Karnataka. After doing her schooling in Mangalore, she graduated in Computer Science engineering from N.M.A.M. Institute of Technology, Nitte.

Career
While in college, Shetty did a few modelling assignments following appearances in several television commercials. She later moved to Bangalore and took part in 2011 Femina Miss India beauty pageant, winning the 'Miss Photogenic' title. She was also a finalist at the Ford Super Model of the World – India contest held at New Delhi in 2011. She was noticed by fashion guru Prasad Bidapa and subsequently walked the ramp for several designers, most notably at the 'Blenders Pride Bangalore Fashion Week' in 2011 and 2012 and Chennai International Fashion Week 2011.

She also worked as a commercial model and appeared in several print and television advertisements. A few of her most notable endorsements in print are for Reliance Jewels, Malabar Gold, VBJ, Palam Silks, Psr and Club Mahindra. Her television advertisements include those for Clinic Plus, Toyota Altis, Santoor and TVS Victor.

In 2012, Shetty entered the Indian film industry. She first signed to Shivani, a bilingual horror flick, made in Telugu and Tamil, in which she played a journalist. However, the delay of this film meant that Shetty's maiden release was the Kannada film Nam Duniya Nam Style (2013) by Preetham Gubbi. While the film received mixed reviews, critics noted that Shetty had "given [a] lively performance"  and "show[n] tremendous promise". Her future releases include  the semi-period Kannada film Vijayaaditya. She has also been cast as one of the female leads in A. L. Vijay's next Tamil film, which according to Shetty is a "fun-filled" romantic drama set against a college backdrop.

Her fame increased in industry from the success of Ishtakamya, directed by well known filmmaker Nagathihalli Chandrashekar. She signed three movies scheduled to release in 2017: Smile Please, starring Gurunandan, MMM''', with Aru Gowda; and Silicon City, with Srinagar Kitty.

The year 2020 and 2021 saw Kavya in movies of both Kannada and Telugu language. Kavya set her feet on the sets of Ravichandran's upcoming movie Ravi Bopanna as a lead female, while she was seen in the title track of Yuvarathna starring Puneeth Rajkumar.

Kavya is seen in her upcoming Telugu movie Gurthunda Seethakalam with Satyadev and Tamannaah, Directed by Nagashekar. One of the other major project is Yogi-starrer Lanke where she is sharing screens with Sanchari Vijay, Krishi Thapanda
Kavya is working on her next project with Jayaram Karthik titled Kaada. The movie is set to release early next year. Her other upcoming projects are Sold which is ready for release and 6C for which the shooting is yet to commence.

Personal life
Shetty launched her exclusive clothing and jewellery brand, Kassh  in June 2019. Niharika Vivek and Poornima Shetty are her co-partners.

Aadyaa Foundation believes that education is the fundamental right of every child. Shetty is actively connected with the Aadyaa Foundation and she enjoys spending time with the kids and providing them with food on the weekends.

 Filmography 
 All films in Kannada; otherwise language is noted''

Web series

References

External links 

 

AAdya Foundation

Living people
Tulu people
Actresses in Telugu cinema
Indian film actresses
Actresses in Kannada cinema
Actresses in Tamil cinema
Actresses in Malayalam cinema
Actresses from Mangalore
21st-century Indian actresses
Female models from Karnataka
1989 births